Garifa Kuku (born 30 November 1959) is a Kazakhstani long-distance runner. She competed in the women's marathon at the 2000 Summer Olympics.

References

1959 births
Living people
Athletes (track and field) at the 2000 Summer Olympics
Kazakhstani female long-distance runners
Kazakhstani female marathon runners
Olympic athletes of Kazakhstan
Place of birth missing (living people)